Ngari Prefecture or Ali Prefecture is a prefecture of China's Tibet Autonomous Region covering Western Tibet, whose traditional name is Ngari Khorsum. Its administrative centre and largest settlement is the town of Shiquanhe. It is one of the least densely populated areas in the world, with 0.3 people per kilometer (0.85 per mile).

History

Ngari was once the heart of the ancient kingdom of Guge. Later Ngari, along with Ü and Tsang, composed Ü-Tsang, one of the traditional provinces of Tibet, the others being Amdo and Kham.

The prefecture has close cultural links with Kinnaur and Lahaul and Spiti district of the bordering Indian state of Himachal Pradesh.

Geography and climate
The paved Xinjiang-Tibet Highway passes through this area. There are well-known prehistoric petroglyphs near the far western town of Rutog.

Ngari Gunsa Airport began operations on July 1, 2010, becoming the fourth civil airport in Tibet (shortening the trip to Lhasa to one-and-a-half hours from three or four days by car) along with Lhasa Gonggar Airport in Lhasa, Qamdo Bamda Airport in Chamdo and Nyingchi Mainling Airport.

Ngari is best known for Mount Kailash, also called Sumeru, and Lake Manasarovar. The holy mountain and lake are associated with number of religions: Buddhism, Hinduism, and Bon, among others, attracting numerous domestic and international religious pilgrims and tourists. Surrounding Mount Kailash are four ancient and famous monasteries: Zhabura, Chiu Gompa, Zheri and Zhozhub.

Ngari has a cold desert climate (Köppen climate classification: BWk), with strong dry-winter subarctic climate tendencies (Köppen climate classification: Dwc).

Subdivisions
Ngari Prefecture is subdivided into seven county-level divisions: seven counties.

See also
 Winter storms of 2009–2010 in East Asia
 Tibet
 Himalayas
 2020 China–India skirmishes

Footnotes

Further reading
 Bellezza, John Vincent: Zhang Zhung. Foundations of Civilization in Tibet. A Historical and Ethnoarchaeological Study of the Monuments, Rock Art, Texts, and Oral Tradition of the Ancient Tibetan Upland. Denkschriften der phil.-hist. Klasse 368. Beitraege zur Kultur- und Geistesgeschichte Asiens 61, Verlag der Oesterreichischen Akademie der Wissenschaften, Wien 2008.
 Ngari Prefecture Annals Editing Office. 2009. Ngari Prefecture Annals.  (English language Table of Contents: pp. 1585-1600)
 Zeisler, Bettina. (2010). "East of the Moon and West of the Sun? Approaches to a Land with Many Names, North of Ancient India and South of Khotan." In: The Tibet Journal, Special issue. Autumn 2009 vol XXXIV n. 3-Summer 2010 vol XXXV n. 2. "The Earth Ox Papers", edited by Roberto Vitali, pp. 371–463.

External links
 Ngari
 Ngari (Tibet Online)
 西藏阿里 ('Ngari, Tibet') (2002) 

 
Tibet
Prefecture-level divisions of Tibet
Himalayas